Ringway Centre is a Grade B locally listed building located on Smallbrook Queensway in the city centre of Birmingham, England.

Completed in 1962, the Ringway Centre was the first part of the Inner Ring Road scheme to be completed, and the only part with street-level shops and footways. The building currently provides office space on its upper floors and commercial space at street level.

History

Smallbrook Street was built up during the medieval period as the start of the route southwest of the Bull Ring Markets. By the early twentieth century the site of the Ringway Centre was occupied by many small Victorian commercial and residential buildings. In 1940, during World War II, most of the buildings on the south side of Smallbrook Street were destroyed by German bombing including the Frank Matcham designed, Empire Palace Theatre of 1894 on the corner of Smallbrook Street and Hurst Street. A few buildings survived the Birmingham Blitz most notably the Scala Cinema which stood at the western end of the Ringway until it demolition in 1960 for the construction of Scala House. From 1940 until 1957 the areas to the south of Smallbrook Street was used as a car park or temporary second hand car dealerships, the remaining buildings were demolished in 1957

It is partly due to the destruction of this area during the Birmingham Blitz that led to the Ringway Centre being the first part of the Inner Ring Road to be built with construction commencing in 1957. This part of the Inner Ring Road is unique in that it has pavements on either side, enclosed by buildings with shop fronts at street level. It was for this reason that in 1959 the Ringway Centre was criticised by the head of the Birmingham School of Planning, Leslie Ginsberg as being old fashioned.

After this section of the ring road was constructed the decision was made to separate pedestrians from traffic in the form of underpasses, subways and flyovers. The designer of the ring road Herbert Manzoni, believed that pedestrians should never cross carriageway of the ring road. Laing Construction were appointed as principal contractors for construction. The Hurst Street overpass was the first part of the building to be constructed completed in 1959. 

Current tenants of the commercial units include Snobs nightclub, as well as restaurants, newsagents, fast food takeaways and a specialist music store. The office floors have historically attracted railway companies due to its proximity to New Street railway station.

Architecture

The building was designed by local architect James Roberts who went on to design the Albany Hotel opposite in 1962 and the Grade II listed Rotunda in 1965. The structural elements of the entire building are constructed of in-situ and pre-cast concrete which was innovative at the time as no steel was needed in its construction and it was fire resistant. Architectural historian, Andy Foster describes the Ringway Centre as:

The façade of the building has a blend of thin concrete mullions, bands of windows and relief panels. The pre-cast abstract geometric relief panels are similar in form to the works of Ben Nicholson. There are projecting sculptural concrete trough uplighters which highlight the relief panels at night. In the centre a glazed section bridges Hurst Street on a pair of ribbed splayed concrete piloti, the building was carried over Hurst Street to ensure the continuous sweep of the building along the south side of the road.

In July 2016, the building was refused listed status by Historic England which, enables redevelopment to take place by the owner. Historic England stated that:

Historic England also issued a Certificate of Immunity from Listing in March 2022.

See also

Architecture of Birmingham

Notes

References

Buildings and structures in Birmingham, West Midlands
Buildings and structures completed in 1962